Jorge Luis Valencia Arredondo (born 6 April 1991) is a Mexican former professional footballer who played as a defender.

Honours
Mexico U20
CONCACAF U-20 Championship: 2011
FIFA U-20 World Cup 3rd Place: 2011

References

External links

1991 births
Living people
Mexico under-20 international footballers
Sportspeople from Querétaro City
Footballers from Querétaro
Tigres UANL footballers
Querétaro F.C. footballers
Irapuato F.C. footballers
Mexican footballers
Association football defenders